Rawang may refer to:

 Nung Rawang, an ethnic group based in Myanmar
 Rawang, Selangor, Malaysia, the district capital of Gombak until 1997
 Rawang (federal constituency), in Selangor, Malaysia
 Rawang (state constituency), in Selangor, Malaysia
 Rawang Panca Arga, a subdistrict in Asahan Regency, North Sumatra, Indonesia
 Rawang language, spoken by the Nung Rawang
 Rawang railway station